William Cornwell may refer to:
 William Cornwell (cricketer) (1838–1915), English cricketer
 William B. Cornwell (1864–1926), American lawyer, businessman and publisher in West Virginia
 William H. Cornwell (1843–1903), American businessman and Hawaiian politician
 William J. Cornwell (1809–1896), American lawyer and politician from New York